This is a list of events in the year 1947 in the Republic of China. This year is numbered Minguo 36 according to the official Republic of China calendar.

Incumbents
 President – Chiang Kai-shek
 Vice President – Li Zongren
 Premier – T. V. Soong, Chiang Kai-shek (acting), Zhang Qun
 Vice Premier – Weng Wenhao, Wang Yunwu

Events

January
 7 January – The establishment of Tainan County in Taiwan
 21–28 January – Campaign to the South of Baoding

February
 28 February – Start of February 28 Incident in Taiwan

April
 8–30 April – Zhengtai Campaign

March
 19 March – Battle of Yan'an

May
 1–4 May – Zhengtai Campaign.
 13–16 May – Menglianggu Campaign
May 13 – July 1 – Summer Offensive of 1947 in Northeast China
June 25 – July 6 – Campaign to the North of Baoding

July 

 29 July - 1947 Assam earthquake

August
 13–18 August – Meridian Ridge Campaign
September 14 – November 5 – Autumn Offensive of 1947 in Northeast China
October 29 – November 25 – Campaign in the Eastern Foothills of the Funiu Mountains

October 

 Yu Tse-san Incident

December
 7–9 December – Battle of Phoenix Peak
 25 December – The Constitution of the Republic of China went into effect.

Births
 14 April – Chou Kung-shin, Director of National Palace Museum (2008–2012)
 26 April – Lee Han-shen, President of Taiwan Power Company (2010–2013)
 5 July – Lin Chun-te, member of Legislative Yuan (1999–2008)
 10 September – Tseng Yung-chuan, Secretary-General of the Presidential Office (2012, 2015–2016)
 5 November
 Hsu Tsai-li – Mayor of Keelung City (2001–2007)
 Yang Chao-hsiang – Minister of Education (1999–2000)
 16 December – Wu Nai-ren, Secretary-General of Democratic Progressive Party (2000–2002, 2009, 2010)

Deaths
May 16 – Zhang Lingfu, general

See also
 List of Chinese films of the 1940s

References

 
1940s in China
1947 in Taiwan
Years of the 20th century in China
Years of the 20th century in Taiwan